Shelter Cove Airport  is a public airport located in Shelter Cove, serving Humboldt County, California, USA. This general aviation airport covers 50 acres and has one runway.

The proximity to the ocean and on-field restaurant make the Shelter Cove Airport a popular fly-in destination when weather permits.

Accidents and incidents
On 28 June 1971, Douglas C-47 N90627 of Lake Riverside Estates crashed on take-off on a domestic non-scheduled passenger flight to San Jose International Airport. Seventeen of the 24 people on board were killed. The cause of the accident was that flight was attempted with the rudder and elevator gust locks in place. Inadequate pre-flight inspection was a contributory factor.

References

External links 
Shelter Cove Airport Association
Mi Mochima - Venezuelan, occupies the former Chart Room restaurant
The Chart Room - on-field restaurant
Live Webcams at Shelter Cove Airport

Airports in Humboldt County, California